Martin Manaskov (born 7 June 1994) is a Macedonian handball player who plays for GRK Ohrid and the Macedonian national team.

His brother Dejan Manaskov is also a handball player and his father Pepi Manaskov is a former handball player.

References

1994 births
Living people
Macedonian male handball players
Sportspeople from Veles, North Macedonia
Mediterranean Games competitors for North Macedonia
Competitors at the 2018 Mediterranean Games